The Ministry of Transport or Transportation is a cabinet-level federal ministry in Brazil. It is the body responsible to enforce and direct regulations concerning transport, from roads and railways to ports and aviation and it also advises the President of Brazil in the execution and formulation of these policies. It was first established in 1992, during Fernando Collor de Mello's presidency. It was dissolved on 1 January 2019 during Jair Bolsonaro's government and merged into the Ministry of Infrastructure. The first minister to take office into the ministry since its re-creation in 2023 is Renan Filho.

The body was re-created by President Luiz Inácio Lula da Silva, on January 1, 2023, being a result of the dissolution and division of former Ministry of Infrastructure into the Ministry of Transport and the Ministry of Ports and Airports.

Chronology 
The ministry has had several denominations:

 1860 to 1891 — Secretary of State for Agriculture, Commerce and Public Works
 1891 to 1906 — Ministry of Industry, Transport and Public Works
 1906 to 1967 — Ministry of Transport and Public Works
 1967 to 1990 — Ministry of Transport
 1990 to 1992 — Ministry of Infrastructure
 April 10, 1992 to November 19, 1992 — Ministry of Transport and Communications
 November 19, 1992 to May 12, 2016 — Ministry of Transport
 May 12, 2016 to December 31, 2018 — Ministry of Transportation, Ports and Civil Aviation
 January 1, 2019 to December 31, 2022 — Ministry of Infrastructure
 since 1 January, 2023 — Ministry of Transport (re-created for the sixth time)

List of ministers of Transport of Brazil

Old Republic (First Brazilian Republic)

Vargas Era (Second and Third Brazilian Republic)

Populist Republic (Fourth Brazilian Republic)

Military Dictatorship (Fifth Brazilian Republic)

New Republic (Sixth Brazilian Republic)

See also
 Other ministries of Transport

References

External links 
 Official site 

Transport
Brazil
Transport organisations based in Brazil
1860 establishments in Brazil